Pol Antràs Puchal (born June 30, 1975, in Barcelona, Spain) is a Spanish economist. He is Robert G. Ory Professor of Economics at Harvard University, where he has taught since 2003. 

He received his BA and MSc in economics in 1998 and 1999, respectively, from Pompeu Fabra University Barcelona and his PhD in economics from MIT in 2003. He is a research associate at the National Bureau of Economic Research (NBER), where he served as director of the International Trade and Organization (ITO) Working Group. He is also a research affiliate at the Centre for Economic Policy Research (CEPR) and is a member of CESifo’s Research Network. Since 2015, he has served as editor of the Quarterly Journal of Economics, the peer-reviewed journal with the highest impact factor in the field of economics.

Early life and education 
A citizen of Spain, Antràs grew up in Barcelona attending Aula Escola Europea from 1978 until 1993. After a year in New Mexico as a foreign exchange student at the Albuquerque Academy, he attended Universitat Pompeu Fabra in Barcelona, receiving his BA in 1998 and MSc in Economics in 1999, in both cases graduating with honors. He was awarded a PhD in Economics from the Massachusetts Institute of Technology in 2003.

Research 
Antràs is a renowned international trade economist, particularly known for his contributions to the so-called "New" New Trade Theory, which stresses the importance of firms rather than sectors in understanding the challenges and the opportunities countries face in the age of globalization. In his 2003 Ph.D. thesis, Antràs developed a workhorse model of multinational firms and global sourcing that emphasizes the role of contractual frictions in shaping the international organization of production. Much of his early work on the topic is overviewed in his book Firms, Contracts and Trade Structure (2015, Princeton University Press).

More recently, Antràs’ research has focused on understanding the emergence of global value chains. His work has specifically emphasized the sequential nature of certain production processes, and the implications of this sequentiality for the global sourcing decisions of firms, and for the implications of trade wars. Together with Davin Chor, he developed an influential model of global value chains, while also developing a widely used measure of the position (or upstreamness) of industries in global value chains. This work was the basis of his 2018 Ohlin Lecture at the Stockholm School of Economics.

Other professional activities 
Since 2015, he has served as editor of the Quarterly Journal of Economics. Previously he served on the editorial board of the American Economic Review, the Review of Economic Studies, the Journal of International Economics, and the Annual Review of Economics, among other journals.

Honors 
Among other distinctions, he was awarded an Alfred P. Sloan Research Fellowship in 2007 and the Fundación Banco Herrero Prize in 2009, and he was elected Fellow of the Econometric Society in 2015.

References

External links
 
 official Harvard profile
 

Economists from Catalonia
21st-century  Spanish economists
1975 births
Living people
People from Barcelona
Harvard University faculty
Pompeu Fabra University alumni
MIT School of Humanities, Arts, and Social Sciences alumni
Fellows of the Econometric Society
Economics journal editors